David Andersson may refer to:

 David Andersson (musician) (1975–2022), Swedish heavy metal guitarist (Soilwork)
 David Andersson (orienteer) (born 1981), Swedish orienteering competitor
 David Andersson (speed skater) (born 1994), Swedish speed skater

See also
 David Anderson (disambiguation)